Championship Manager: Season 99/00 is a football management video game in Sports Interactive's Championship Manager series. It was released for Microsoft Windows on 3 December 1999, and for Mac on 10 December 1999. The game allowed players to take charge of clubs from sixteen countries; with responsibility for training, tactics and signings.

Release
The game was released for Microsoft Windows on 3 December 1999. It sold over 27,000 copies in its first week.

For the first time in the series the game was released for Mac users on 10 December 1999.

New features

Even though the look and feel of the game was essentially the same as Championship Manager 3, there were many new features including a quicker match engine with enhanced commentary, the ability to fine and discipline players, improved board interaction, and the capability to improve your stadium and facilities. Additionally, the database was increased to feature over 40,000 players and staff, and Major League Soccer was included as a playable league for the first time.

Reception

PC

Championship Manager 99/00 received positive reviews across the board. GameSpot gave it an almost faultless 9.5 out of 10. Computer Games Magazine gave it 4.5 stars and described it as “the most realistic sports management game available, bar none”. The Sports Gaming Network gave it a 98% rating and proclaimed it was “the finest sports game ever made”.

Mac
MacGaming called Championship Manager 99/00 "a beast of a game", ultimately awarding it a 93% rating.

Accolades

The game received a "Gold" sales award from the Entertainment and Leisure Software Publishers Association (ELSPA), indicating sales of at least 200,000 copies in the United Kingdom.

References

External links
 Championship Manager 99/00 at Sports Interactive

1999 video games
Eidos Interactive games
Windows games
Classic Mac OS games
Multiplayer hotseat games
Video game sequels
Association football management video games
Video games developed in the United Kingdom